Mabel Akomu Oboh popularly known as Mabel Oboh (born 18 April) is a Nigerian broadcaster, actress, film producer and founder Mabeloboh Center For Save Our Stars (MOCSOS). She is the first television film independent producer/director and the second female soap opera producer in Nigeria with her drama series titled Victims that later became a network productions in the '80s on Nigerian Television Authority.

Early life
Mabel hails from Edo State, Nigeria. She was born in Lagos on 18 April, into the family of the late Major Humphrey Etafo Oboh and the late Mrs Comfort Oboh. She is an alumna of Buckinghamshire New University where she had her degree in Criminology.

Career
She started her career in the entertainment industry in the early 80s after her training in cinematograph, stage craft, speech and drama. She became  the second female independent producer and director in Nigeria with her drama series titled Victims that later became a network productions in the '80s and was aired on Nigerian Television Authority (NTA). In the year 2000, she became the first chat show hostess 'Chat with Mabel' on NTA Network Service.

She joined NTA in the 1990s as a news correspondent to the Lagos State house, before working with United Nations and later left UN and joined British Embassy in Poland in the commercial and Visa sections.

Mabel donated the first music studio in Agegunle; Owned by her brother John oboh, aka mighty mouse who created the Ajegunle beat genre in 1991. Her contribution help to discovered and produced Daddy Showkey, Daddy Fresh, Baba Fryo, African china, danfo drivers and marvelous Benji. She was given a recognition Award in 2017 by AJ to the world.

Politics
Mabel was a public Spokesperson of African Democratic Congress (ADC).

She was a female aspirant on the platform of African Democratic Congress in 2020 Edo State gubernatorial election.

The gubernatorial candidate of the African Democratic Congress, ADC, in the 19 September 2020 governorship election in Edo State, defected after she came fourth in 2020 Edo State gubernatorial election and joined the ruling Peoples Democratic Party (Nigeria) (PDP).

In 2022, She returned back to African Democratic Congress (ADC) and was appointed the Party National  Diversity and Inclusion (D&I) Secretary  where she would be relating with the electorate.

Mocsos
She founded Mabel Oboh Centre for Save our Stars (MOCSOS), with the sole aim of catering for the health needs of Nigerian entertainers  and the foundation has assisted Yellow banton, Sadiq Daba, etc.

Personal life
She has 3 sons; Magnus I. Oboh Leonard, Jason Eloyowan Leonard, Ralph  Leonard.

References

1964 births
Living people
Nigerian broadcasters
Nigerian film producers
21st-century Nigerian women
Nigerian women journalists
Nigerian television journalists
20th-century Nigerian actresses
21st-century Nigerian actresses
African Democratic Congress politicians
Nigerian women film directors
Edo State politicians
Nigerian television actresses
Nigerian television personalities
Alumni of Buckinghamshire New University
People from Edo State
Nigerian humanitarians
Nigerian television producers
Nigerian television directors
Nigerian women film producers
Nigerian actor-politicians